The German Curling Association (DCV) (German: Deutscher Curling Verband) is the national governing body of the sport of curling in Germany.

Member clubs 

There are 16 curling clubs in Germany.

Competitive history

World Curling Championships

Men's 
As of 2019 Germany has made 48 appearances at the men's World Curling Championships, earning a medal 10 of those times.

Women's 
As of 2019 Germany has made 37 appearances at the women's World Curling Championships, earning a medal 8 of those times.

Olympics

Men's 
Germany has qualified 5 times for men's curling at the Winter Olympics, with their best finish being 6th (twice).

Women's 
Germany has qualified 3 times for women's curling at the Winter Olympics, with their best finish being 5th.

References

External links 
 Official website (German)

Curling in Germany
Curling governing bodies
Curling